Steven A. Denning (born September 14, 1948) is an American businessman and philanthropist. He is Chairman Emeritus of global growth equity firm General Atlantic. Denning has been with General Atlantic since its founding in 1980, leading the firm as CEO from 1995 to 2006 when he assumed the role of chairman. He helped build General Atlantic with a singular vision of supporting entrepreneurs as they work to grow their businesses.

Career and education 

Denning co-founded growth equity firm General Atlantic in 1980 as the firm's second investment professional. He served as CEO from 1995 to 2007 when he was appointed chairman. In 2021 he became Chairman Emeritus, succeeded as chairman by current General Atlantic CEO, Bill Ford.

In addition to his roles as founding partner, CEO, and chairman at General Atlantic, Denning also served as a member of the firm's executive, capital, investment, and portfolio committees, and sat on the boards of numerous portfolio companies during his career. He is currently an advisory member of the board of Starr Companies.

Prior to joining General Atlantic, Denning worked at McKinsey & Company and served for six-years in the United States Navy.

Denning earned his M.B.A. from the Stanford Graduate School of Business, his M.S. from the Naval Postgraduate School in Monterey, California, and a B.S. from the Georgia Institute of Technology on a Navy ROTC scholarship.

Philanthropy and public positions 

Denning is active at Stanford, serving on the university's Board of Trustees from 2004 to 2017, including as its chair from 2012 to 2017. He also served as co-chair of The Stanford Challenge. He chaired the board's Task Force on Globalization, which later became the Special Committee on Globalization. He served as chair of the Endowment Strategic Review Committee and as chair of the Presidential Advisory Committee on New York. He continues to serve on a variety of advisory boards and councils at Stanford; he is vice chair of the Human-Centered Artificial Intelligence advisory council, chair of the president's global advisory council and the Natural Capital advisory council. He is a member of the advisory council of the Freeman Spogli Institute, the Knight-Hennessy Scholar Program advisory board and the Stanford Distinguished Careers Institute advisory council. He has given numerous talks at the university. Denning is involved in other higher education philanthropies as a member of the board of directors of College Advising Corps; he was a trustee of the Georgia Tech Foundation and was a member of the advisory board of Tsinghua School of Economics and Management. He also served on the board of visitors of Columbia College.

He supports several environmental and conservationist groups; he is a member of the National Park Foundation board and the Columbia Climate board of advisors, where he also serves on the executive committee. He is an honorary trustee of the American Museum of Natural History. He was co-chair of the board of directors of the Nature Conservancy and was a trustee of the National Parks Conservation Society.

Denning is also active in international relations and U.S. public policy. He is a life member of the Council on Foreign Relations and is vice chair of the board of trustees of the Carnegie Endowment for International Peace. He is also on the boards of the Markle Foundation and Blue Meridian Partners and is on the board of trustees of the Bridgespan Group. He is an honorary trustee of the Brookings Institution. Denning is also a member of the Board of Governors for the Partnership for Public Service. He was a member of the boards of the Connecticut Science Center and Cancer Research Institute, and a member of the advisory council of the McKinsey Investment Office.

Awards and recognition 

Denning was awarded an honorary degree from Georgia Tech in 2019, when he also gave the university's commencement address. Stanford awarded him the 2018 Ernest C. Arbuckle Award. He was named to GrowthCap's Top 10 Pioneers of Growth Equity in 2014 for his work with General Atlantic and was awarded the Stanford Business School's Excellence in Leadership Award in 2007.

Personal life 
Denning is married to Roberta Bowman Denning and has two children, Robert and Carrie. His son, Robert Steven Denning, graduated from Columbia University and Stanford Graduate School of Business and is the founder of sunglasses brand Westward Leaning. His daughter, Carrie Denning Jackson, received her BA, MA, and MBA from Stanford University and is a director at Sidewalk Labs.

References 

American chief executives
American philanthropists
Stanford Graduate School of Business alumni
Georgia Tech alumni
1948 births
Living people